The Principle of Moments is the second solo studio album by the English singer Robert Plant, formerly of Led Zeppelin. It was Plant's second Top 10 album in the US and UK. It also gave him his first solo Top 40 hit with "Big Log". The most popular track on album-oriented rock radio in the US was "Other Arms", which reached number-one on the Billboard Top Tracks chart. Genesis' drummer Phil Collins played drums for five of the album's eight songs (as he did on Pictures at Eleven). On the other two tracks former Jethro Tull drummer Barriemore Barlow performed. On the closing track "Big Log", Gerald Woodroffe programmed a Roland TR-808 drum machine.

Like Plant's debut solo studio album, Pictures at Eleven (1982), the songs departed from the hard rock sound of Led Zeppelin. Following the strength of these albums, Plant launched a successful tour in 1983. Phil Collins was the drummer for Plant's band for the North American portion of the tour. Collins was content to perform in the background, despite his own enormous success as a solo artist and with Genesis at the time. Little Feat's Richie Hayward played drums for the remaining dates.

Rhino Entertainment released a remastered edition of the album, with bonus tracks, on 3 April 2007.

Promotional music videos
The music video for "Big Log" was shot at the following locations: Crystal Road, Crystal, Nevada (gas station sequences), the Amargosa Opera House, Death Valley Junction, California (driving and "feather" sequence), Calico School House (Calico Ghost Town) Yermo, California (schoolhouse sequence), Glass Pool Inn, Las Vegas, Nevada (pool sequence). The bar sequence is believed to have been shot at a small bar in Shoshone, California (now the Crow Bar Cafe & Saloon), though this is unconfirmed.

A video for "In the Mood" was also produced.

Tour
In 1983, Robert Plant went on a tour to promote the album, starting on 26 August in Peoria, Illinois, and ending on 1 October in Vancouver, British Columbia.

Track listing

Live tracks: recorded in Houston, Texas in 1983.

Personnel
Robert Plant – lead vocals and backing vocals
Robbie Blunt – guitars
Gerald Woodroffe – synthesizers, Roland TR-808 on track 8
Paul Martinez – basses
Phil Collins – drums, except 4, 7, and 8  (incl. bonus tracks) 
Barriemore Barlow – drums on tracks 4 and 7
John David – backing vocals
Ray Martinez – backing vocals

Chart performance

Weekly charts

Year-end charts

Certifications

References

External links

Rockfield Studios
Discography on the Robert Plant Homepage (not an official site)
Big Log video

Robert Plant albums
1983 albums
Atlantic Records albums
Albums recorded at Rockfield Studios
Albums with cover art by Hipgnosis